The Writers Guild of America Award for Television: Episodic Comedy is an award presented by the Writers Guild of America to the best written comedy episodes of television series. It was first presented at the 13th annual Writers Guild of America awards in 1961 and has been presented annually since the 17th annual Writers Guild of America awards in 1965.

The years denote when the episode first aired. Though, due to the eligibility period, some nominees could have aired in a different year. The current eligibility period is December 1 to November 30. The winners are highlighted in gold.

Winners and nominees

1960s

1970s

1980s

1990s

2000s

2010s

2020s

Total awards
 NBC – 25
 CBS – 20
 ABC – 11
 Fox – 2
 Showtime – 2
 HBO – 2
 FX – 1
 Netflix – 1

Writers with multiple awards

4 awards
 Robert Carlock

3 awards
 Larry Gelbart

2 awards
 Sam Bobrick
 Bob Daily
 Larry David
 Diane English
 Jim Fritzell
 Gary David Goldberg
 Everett Greenbaum
 Bill Idelson
 David Isaacs
 Joe Keenan
 Ken Levine
 Steven Levitan 
 Christopher Lloyd

Programs with multiple awards

7 awards
M*A*S*H (CBS)

6 awards
Frasier (NBC)

4 awards
30 Rock (NBC)
Seinfeld (NBC)

3 awards
Cheers (NBC)<ref group=fn>Cheers''' double win in 1983 is counted as only one win.</ref>The Dick Van Dyke Show (CBS)Modern Family (ABC)

2 awardsBarney Miller (ABC)Murphy Brown (CBS)The Office (NBC)The Wonder Years (ABC)

Writers with multiple nominations

7 nominations
 David Isaacs
 Ken Levine

6 nominations
 Robert Carlock
 Cindy Chupack
 Larry David
 Larry Gelbart
 Gary David Goldberg

5 nominations
 Allan Burns
 Ken Estin
 Everett Greenbaum
 Steven Levitan
 David Lloyd
 Laurence Marks
 Reinhold Weege

4 nominations
 Bob Ellison
 Diane English
 Matt Hubbard
 Jenji Kohan
 Thad Mumford
 John Rappaport
 Arne Sultan
 Ed. Weinberger
 Dan Wilcox

3 nominations
 Jerry Belson
 Jenny Bicks
 James L. Brooks
 Glen Charles
 Les Charles
 Stan Daniels
 Elias Davis
 Jim Fritzell
 Chris Hayward
 Joe Keenan
 Paul Lieberstein
 David Mandel
 Garry Marshall
 Heidi Perlman
 David Pollock 
 Jeffrey Richman
 Julie Rottenberg
 Jay Tarses
 Neil Thompson
 Elisa Zuritsky

2 nominations
 Alan Alda
 Jenna Bans
 Earl Barret 
 Ruth Bennett
 Alec Berg
 James Berg
 Carol Black
 Linda Bloodworth-Thomason 
 Sam Bobrick
 Jack Burditt
 Paul Corrigan
 Bob Daily
 Greg Daniels
 Jack Elinson
 Barry Fanaro
 Liz Feldman
 Tina Fey
 Maya Forbes
 Bryan Fuller
 Greg Garcia
 Lila Garrett
 Howard Gewirtz
 Charlie Grandy
 Rob Greenberg
 Terry Grossman
 Karen Hall
 Bill Idelson
 Milt Josefsberg
 Bernie Kahn
 Barry Kemp
 Michael Patrick King
 Jon Kinnally
 Carl Kleinschmitt
 Elaine Ko
 Mort Lachman
 Bill Larkin
 Bill Lawrence
 Charles Lee
 Michael Leeson
 Alan J. Levitt 
 Christopher Lloyd
 Chuck Lorre

 Mitch Markowitz
 Neal Marlens
 John Markus
 Tony McNamara
 Dale McRaven
 Peter Mehlman 
 Rick Mittleman
 Gary Murphy
 Kevin Murphy
 Mort Nathan
 B. J. Novak
 Dan O'Shannon
 Rod Parker
 Tracy Poust
 Ian Praiser
 John Rapp
 Carl Reiner
 Gene Reynolds
 Larry Rhine
 John Riggi
 Aaron Ruben
 Bob Schiller
 Jerry Seinfeld
 Michael Schur
 Garry Shandling
 Tony Sheehan
 Amy Sherman-Palladino
 Kathy Speer
 Leonard B. Stern
 Charles Stewart
 Walter Stone
 Tom Straw
 Norman Sullivan
 George Tibbles
 Peter Tolan
 Mel Tolkin
 Rob Ulin 
 Brad Walsh
 Bob Weiskopf
 Lester A. White
 Jack Winter
 Alan Yang
 Stan Zimmerman

Programs with multiple nominations

26 nominationsM*A*S*H (CBS)

14 nominationsSeinfeld (NBC)

13 nominationsCheers (NBC)Modern Family (ABC)

12 nominationsThe Office (NBC)Sex and the City (HBO)Taxi (ABC), (NBC)

11 nominations30 Rock (NBC)All in the Family (CBS)

10 nominationsFrasier (NBC)The Mary Tyler Moore Show (CBS)

9 nominationsBarney Miller (ABC)

8 nominationsThe Dick Van Dyke Show (CBS)

7 nominationsMalcolm in the Middle (Fox)The Wonder Years (ABC)

6 nominationsThe Larry Sanders Show (HBO)

5 nominationsGet Smart (NBC), (CBS)The Golden Girls (NBC)Orange is the New Black (Netflix)

4 nominationsFamily Ties (NBC)Murphy Brown (CBS)Night Court (NBC)Rhoda (CBS)Roseanne (ABC)

3 nominationsThe Days and Nights of Molly Dodd (NBC), (Lifetime)Desperate Housewives (ABC)Grace and Frankie (Netflix)He & She (CBS)Mork & Mindy (ABC)My Name Is Earl (NBC)Room 222 (ABC)Unbreakable Kimmy Schmidt (Netflix)Veep (HBO)

2 nominationsThe Bob Newhart Show (CBS)The Cosby Show (NBC)The Danny Thomas Show (CBS)Dead to Me (Netflix)Dharma & Greg (ABC)Ellen (ABC)Friends (NBC)The Great (Hulu)The Jackie Gleason Show (CBS)Mad About You (NBC)Maude (CBS)My World and Welcome to It (NBC)Parks and Recreation (NBC)Reservation Dogs (FX on Hulu)Weeds (Showtime)Will & Grace'' (NBC)

Footnotes

References

Screenplay